The Parnall Panther was a British carrier based spotter and reconnaissance aircraft designed and developed by Parnall and Sons in the latter years of World War I, continuing in service until 1926. A total of 150 Panthers were built by Bristol Aeroplane Company since after the end of World War I Parnall had stopped aircraft manufacture.

Development
The Parnall Panther was designed by Harold Bolas, who had joined Parnall and Sons after leaving the Admiralty's Air Department, where he had served as deputy chief designer under Harris Booth. It was planned to meet the requirements of Admiralty Specification N.2A for a two-seat reconnaissance aircraft capable of operating from aircraft carriers. The first prototype (serial N91) flew in 1917, with a further five prototypes being produced.

Design
The Panther was a wooden, single-bay biplane, which, unusually for the time, was fitted with a birch plywood monocoque fuselage which could be folded for shipboard storage, the fuselage being hinged aft of the observer's cockpit.  The pilot and observer were seated in individual cockpits in the deep fuselage, this giving a good view for landing, but restricting access to the pilot's cockpit.  Inflatable flotation airbags were fitted beneath the wings to keep the aircraft afloat in the event of ditching into the sea, with a hydrovane fitted in front of the undercarriage in order to stop the aircraft nosing over.

Operational history
After evaluation, an order for 300 Panthers was placed with Parnall in 1918.  However, this was reduced to 150 following the end of the year.  Parnall, which had been purchased by W. & T. Avery Ltd. rejected this reduction in the order, so the order was transferred to the Bristol Aeroplane Company, the order being completed between 1919 and 1920.

The Panther served with Spotter Reconnaissance Flights aboard the aircraft carriers HMS Argus and HMS Hermes.  While the Panthers handled well in the air, the elderly Bentley engines proved unreliable, and the system of longitudinal arrestor wires in use aboard British aircraft carriers at the time, was unsatisfactory, resulting in many accidents.  Panthers continued in service with the Fleet Air Arm until 1926, being replaced by the Fairey IIID.

Twelve Panthers were sold to the Imperial Japanese Navy in 1921–22, with two being sold to the US Navy in 1920.

Operators

 Fleet Air Arm
 Royal Air Force
 No. 205 Squadron RAF

 Imperial Japanese Navy Air Service

 United States Navy

Specifications

See also
 Sempill Mission
 Aircraft carrier
 Royal Naval Air Service

References
Notes

Bibliography

External links

 Parnall Panther – British Aircraft Directory

1910s British military reconnaissance aircraft
Panther
Carrier-based aircraft
Single-engined tractor aircraft
Biplanes
Aircraft first flown in 1917